The following is a list of Major League Baseball players, retired or active. As of the end of the  season, there have been 53 players with a last name that begins with I who have been on a major league roster at one point.

I

References

External links
Last Names starting with I – Baseball-Reference.com

 I